Kanpuriye is a 2019 Indian Hindi-language anthology film directed by Ashish Aryan, produced and bankrolled by Yoodlee films, film division of Saregama with Aparshakti Khurana, Divyenndu, Harsh Mayar, Vijay Raaz, Rajshri Deshpande and Harshita Gaur. It was released on Hotstar on 25 October 2019.

Premise 
The film follows three Kanpur locals each trying to achieve something in life. Jaitun (Aparshakti) works in a leather factory dreaming to marry love of his life Bulbul (Harshita). Jagnu (Harsh) caught in between his dream and his father's plan for him. Vijay (Divyenndu) a fresh law graduate who was unable to pursue his dream job because of impending Court case.

Cast 
 Aparshakti Khurana as Jaitun Mishra
 Divyendu Sharma as Vijay Dinanath Chauhan
 Harsh Mayar as Jugnu Lampat
 Vijay Raaz as Lampat Harami
 Rajshri Deshpande as Kohinoor
 Harshita Gaur as Bulbul Tiwari
 Bhupesh Pandya as Peshkar
 Vani Sood as Prem Kumari
 Chittaranjan Tripathy as Mohan Mishra

Production 
The development of the film started in 2018. Casting was carried in December 2018 various supporting characters. Filming started in early February 2019 with Aparshakti Khurana and Divyenndu.

Release 
Trailer of the film was released on 23 October 2019. The film released on Hotstar under Hotstar Specials label on October 25, 2019.

References

External links 
 
 Kanpuriye on Hotstar

2010s Hindi-language films
Disney+ Hotstar original films
Films scored by Rachita Arora
Indian anthology films
2019 direct-to-video films
2019 films
Films set in Kanpur